QFI may refer to:

QFI (supermarket), a former supermarket chain based in San Francisco
Qualified Flying Instructor, in the Armed Forces